Kirk Thomas Cameron (born October 12, 1970) is an American actor, evangelist, documentary filmmaker, TV show host, producer, and author. He first gained fame as a teen actor playing Mike Seaver on the ABC sitcom Growing Pains (1985–1992), a role for which he was nominated for two Golden Globe Awards.

Cameron made several other television and film appearances through the 1980s and 1990s, including the films Like Father Like Son (1987) and Listen to Me (1989). In the 2000s, he portrayed Cameron "Buck" Williams in the Left Behind film series and Caleb Holt in the drama film Fireproof (2008). His 2014 film, Saving Christmas, was panned by critics and made the IMDb Bottom 100 List within one month of its theatrical release.  He produced documentaries and movies since then, including the 2022 movie, Lifemark, which grossed over $5,000,000 domestically. In 2022, he wrote a faith-based children's book, As You Grow, published by Brave Books, which he read at libraries the following year, during a successful nationwide book tour.

Cameron is an Evangelical Christian who partners with Ray Comfort in the evangelistic ministry The Way of the Master and co-founded The Firefly Foundation with his wife, actress Chelsea Noble.

Early life
Cameron was born in Panorama City, a neighborhood in the San Fernando Valley region of Los Angeles. His parents are Barbara (née Bausmith) and Robert Cameron, a retired schoolteacher. He has three sisters: Bridgette, Melissa, and actress Candace Cameron Bure, who is most notable for her role as D.J. Tanner on the television sitcom Full House. He went to school on the set of Growing Pains, as opposed to a "normal" public or private school with many other students. However, he went to some classes during production breaks and graduated with the class of 1988 at Chatsworth High School with honors.

Acting career

Early career

Cameron began acting at age nine, and his first job was in an advertisement for a breakfast cereal. His first starring role was at age 13, in the television series Two Marriages. At this age, he appeared in several television shows and films. He became famous in 1985 after being cast as Mike Seaver in the ABC television sitcom Growing Pains. In the series, Mike would eventually have a girlfriend named Kate MacDonald, played by Chelsea Noble, Cameron's future wife. Cameron subsequently became a teen heartthrob in the late 1980s, while appearing on the covers of several teen magazines, including Tiger Beat, Teen Beat, 16 and others. At the time, he was making $50,000 a week. He was also in a 60-second Pepsi commercial during Super Bowl XXIV.

Cameron also guest-starred in the 1988 Full House episode "Just One of the Guys", in which he played the cousin of D.J. Tanner, the role played by Cameron's sister, Candace.

Cameron went on to star in many films, including 1987's Like Father Like Son (a body-switch comedy with Dudley Moore), which was a box office success. His next theatrical film, 1989's Listen to Me, performed poorly at the box office. When Growing Pains ended in 1992, Cameron went on to star in The WB sitcom Kirk which premiered in 1995 and ended two years later. In Kirk, Cameron played Kirk Hartman, a 24-year-old who has to raise his siblings. Cameron and Noble also worked together on Kirk.

2000–2010
Cameron mostly left mainstream film and television, though a decade after Growing Pains ended, he starred in a television reunion film, The Growing Pains Movie, in 2000, and another one, Growing Pains: Return of the Seavers, in 2004. Cameron reunited with the cast of Growing Pains for a CNN Larry King Live interview which aired on February 7, 2006, in conjunction with the Warner Bros. release of the complete first season of Growing Pains on DVD. Aside from this, Cameron has often worked in Christian-themed productions, among them the post-Rapture films Left Behind: The Movie, Left Behind II: Tribulation Force, and Left Behind: World at War, in which he plays Cameron "Buck" Williams. Cameron's wife Noble also starred in the film series, playing Hattie Durham. Cameron has worked with Cloud Ten Pictures, a company which produces Christian-themed films, and has starred in several of their films, including The Miracle of the Cards.

He also appeared in the 2008 drama film, Fireproof, which was produced by Sherwood Pictures. The film was created on a budget of $500,000, with Cameron as the lead actor, portraying Captain Caleb Holt. Though it was a low-budget film, the film grossed $33,415,129 and was a box office success. It was the highest grossing independent film of 2008.

2010–present
In 2012, Cameron was the narrator and host of the documentary film Monumental: In Search of America's National Treasure. On its opening day, March 27, 2012, Monumental grossed $28,340. The film stayed in theaters until May 20, 2012, grossing a total of $1.23 million.

In 2013, Cameron announced he would be the host of the film Unstoppable slated to premiere September 24, 2013. A trailer for the film was blocked on Facebook, with Cameron speculating that it was due to the film's religious content. Facebook subsequently removed the block, stating it was the result of a mistake by an automated system and a spam site previously registered at the same web address.

Cameron starred in and produced the 2014 family film Mercy Rule, in which he plays a father who tries to save his small business from lobbyists, while supporting his son, who dreams of being a pitcher, in Little League Baseball. Cameron's real-life wife plays his wife in the film, which was released direct-to-video and via digital download.

Also in 2014, Cameron starred in the Christian-themed comedy film Saving Christmas. The film was panned by critics, winning the 2014 Golden Raspberry Award for Worst Picture and Worst Screenplay. Cameron also won the award for Worst Actor and Worst Screen Combo, which he won with "his ego".

Cameron starred in Extraordinary, a 2017 film made by Liberty University students that was the first such film to be released nationally (for one night in September 2017). The film follows the dream of a marathon running Liberty professor whose cross-country trek strains his body and marriage.

In the 2018 documentary film Connect, Cameron helps parents with navigating the dangers of technology, including social media, for their children.

In 2019, he appeared in an episode of Fuller House, the Netflix sequel to Full House.

In 2021, Cameron started hosting the show, Takeaways with Kirk Cameron, on TBN.  He interviews guests, many of whom are well-known, to discuss pressing issues for Christians with the goal of finding takeaways that everyday Christians can use in their own lives.

In 2022, Cameron produced and starred in the documentary, The Homeschool Awakening, that explores the world of homeschooling.

Also, in 2022, Cameron starred in the Kendrick Brothers film, Lifemark, a box office success grossing over $5,000,000 domestically. Cameron played Jimmy Colton. the adoptive father of David Colton. 

That same year, Cameron wrote a faith-based children's book, As You Grow, published by Brave Books, which follows the life of a tree as it grows and shares "biblical wisdom through the seasons of life." The following year, Cameron embarked on a nationwide book tour, reading his book to often over-capacity crowds at many libraries.

Conversion to Christianity
Cameron was an atheist in his early teens. When he was 17, during the height of his career on Growing Pains, he became a born-again Christian.

After converting to Protestant Christianity, Cameron stated in his autobiography, he came to feel that some of his scenes were antithetical to his newfound faith, and inappropirate for the family viewers that were the show's intended audience. Among these was a scene that called for the unmarried Mike Seaver to share a bed with a girl and, in the morning, say to her, "What's your name again?" For these reasons, he began insisting that these types of storylines be edited to remove the parts that he found objectionable.

After the series ended, Cameron did not maintain contact with his former co-stars. Cameron has stated that this was not due to any animosity on his part toward any of his former cast members, but an outgrowth of his and his wife's desire to start a new life away from the entertainment industry and, as he put it, "... the circus he had been in for the past seven years".

Prior to the premiere of The Growing Pains Movie in 2000, for which the entire main cast reunited, Cameron described his regrets over how his relationship with his castmates changed after his religious conversion during production of the series, saying, "I definitely kind of made an about-face, going toward another aspect of my life. I shifted my focus from 100% on the show, to 100% on [my new life], and left 0% on the show—and even the friendships that were a part of that show. If I could go back, I think I could make decisions that were less inadvertently hurtful to the cast—like talking and explaining to them why I just wanted to have my family at my wedding."

In a 2011 Growing Pains cast reunion on Good Morning America, Alan Thicke, who played Cameron's father, said, "Kirk's choices for a lot of people seemed extreme, but when you think about all of the choices that kids could make under the pressure that he had, what better choice could you make than to choose a religious spiritual life?"

Cameron's conversion to Christianity also prompted an commitmentment to kissing no one other than his wife onscreen. For this reason, his real-life wife served as a stand-in for a scene in the film Fireproof in which his character, Caleb Holt, kisses his wife Catherine, who is played in the film by Erin Bethea. The scene was shot in silhouette to obscure this fact.

Cameron relates in his autobiography that he once turned down a TV series because, as he put it, he was unwilling to spend more time being a make-believe husband and father to an onset wife and children than he would spend with his actual wife and children, choosing instead to appear in or produce films and TV shows whose content is in keeping with his faith-based values. He also tours the nation to give marriage and family seminars and talks.

In August 2017, Cameron and Noble created the online marriage course The Heart of Family: Six Weeks to a Happier Home and a Healthier Family.

Evangelistic ministry
Cameron partnered with fellow evangelist Ray Comfort to teach evangelism methods through the ministry they founded, The Way of the Master, and the television show of the same name that Cameron co-hosts. It won the National Religious Broadcasters' Best Program Award for two consecutive years. It also formerly featured a radio show known as The Way of the Master Radio with talk show host Todd Friel. The radio show was later canceled, and replaced with Wretched Radio, hosted by Friel. Cameron, along with his wife, founded The Firefly Foundation, which runs Camp Firefly, a summer camp that gives terminally ill children and their families a free week's vacation.

Cameron and Comfort participated in a televised debate with atheists Brian Sapient and Kelly O'Conner of the Rational Response Squad, at Calvary Baptist Church, in Manhattan, on May 5, 2007. It was moderated by ABC's Martin Bashir and parts of it were aired on Nightline. At issue was the existence of God, which Comfort stated at various times during his ministry that he could prove scientifically without relying on faith or the Bible. However, he never committed to this restriction for the debate, itself, as later clarified by The Christian Post in a correction they made at the very end of their article about the debate. The audience was composed of both theists and atheists. Points of discussion included atheism and evolution. While Sapient contended during his arguments that Comfort violated the rules by talking about the Ten Commandments, Cameron later stated on The Way of the Master radio show that the rules of the debate did not say that the Bible could never be referenced, but rather that Comfort simply had to come up with one argument that did not reference the Bible or faith. During the debate, Cameron referred to the absence of a crocoduck to dispute the theory of evolution, which then became a meme to highlight misconceptions about the theory.

In November 2009, Cameron and others distributed free copies of an altered version of Charles Darwin's On the Origin of Species on college campuses in the United States. The book consisted of Darwin's text with chapters of the book removed, and with an added introduction by Ray Comfort reiterating common creationist assertions about Darwin and evolution. The book was criticized by scientists and Darwin biographers who criticized the omission of key chapters of the book, and who stated that its introduction contains misinformation about Darwin, and long-refuted creationist arguments about the science of evolution, such as the linking of Nazi racial theories to Darwinist ideas. Comfort later said that the four chapters were chosen at random to be omitted in order to make the book small enough to be affordable as a giveaway, with the absent chapters available for download, but that the missing chapters were included in the second edition, which had a smaller text size that made printing the entire book as a giveaway affordable. The second edition still lacks Darwin's preface and glossary of terms. The National Center for Science Education arranged a campaign to distribute an analysis of the Comfort introduction and a banana bookmark at colleges across the U.S., a reference to Comfort's presentation of the banana as evidence for the existence of God.

On March 2, 2012, Cameron stated on CNN's Piers Morgan Tonight, when asked about homosexuality, that it is "unnatural, it's detrimental and ultimately destructive to so many of the foundations of civilization". Cameron's comments received criticism from GLAAD, and provoked a backlash from gay rights activists and Hollywood celebrities, including Roseanne Barr, Craig Ferguson, Jesse Tyler Ferguson, as well as Growing Pains co-stars Tracey Gold and Alan Thicke. Piers Morgan stated that Cameron was brave for expressing his opinion, "however antiquated his beliefs may be". He, however, received "thousands of emails and comments" from supporters. Rosie O'Donnell invited him to discuss his views on her talk show, but he declined and suggested a private dinner to discuss this topic personally.

On April 11, 2012, Cameron was honored by Indiana Wesleyan University, and inducted into their Society of World Changers during a ceremony in which he spoke on IWU's campus.

Politics
Cameron is an outspoken social conservative. He supported Donald Trump in the 2016 presidential election, saying, "There are clearly enemies of Christian principles and Christianity [and] I don't think Trump is one of them."

COVID-19 views
In 2020, Cameron said that such things as COVID-19 could be used by God to bring about his purposes and that he had suspicions – without specifying what they were – about how COVID-19 got started. He also opposed the designation of churchgoing and extended family Thanksgiving celebrations, implemented to slow the spread of COVID-19 pandemic, as nonessential, saying, "Socialism and communism are knocking on our doors...disguised in the costumes of public health and social justice."

As record-breaking levels of COVID-19 infections in late December 2020 overwhelmed hospitals, Cameron organized at least two gatherings of dozens of people for maskless Christmas caroling protests against enhanced restrictions to combat the second wave of the pandemic. The events, which were lawful, were held outside, in venues such as a mall parking lot in Ventura County, part of the Southern California Region, a group of counties under a state-mandated stay-home order triggered by low ICU capacity. Barbara Ferrer, Los Angeles County Public Health Director, denounced Cameron's decision to hold large gatherings as "very irresponsible and very dangerous." Cameron attempted to justify his actions by claiming that the psychological harm of the COVID-19 lockdowns could be  worse than the coronavirus itself.

Cameron also held an outdoor maskless New Year's Eve song/prayer event in Malibu, despite a request by state senator Henry Stern that he stay home.

Personal life
Cameron and his wife, fellow Growing Pains star Chelsea Noble, were married on July 21, 1991. They have six children, four of whom were adopted: Jack (born 1996), Isabella (born 1997), Anna (born 1998), and Luke (born 2000); and two biological: Olivia (born 2001) and James (born 2003).

Filmography

Television

Film

Video games

Awards and nominations

Books 
 Still Growing: An Autobiography (2008, with Lissa Halls Johnson): 
 As You Grow (2022, published by Brave Books and illustrated by Juan Moreno):

References

External links

 
 
 
 

1970 births
Living people
20th-century American male actors
20th-century evangelicals
21st-century American male actors
21st-century American male writers
21st-century evangelicals
American Christian Young Earth creationists
American evangelicals
American male child actors
American male film actors
American male television actors
California Republicans
Christians from California
Converts to evangelical Christianity
Converts to Christianity from atheism or agnosticism
Evangelical writers
Intelligent design advocates
Male actors from California
People from Panorama City, Los Angeles